Flowers is a studio album by the American girl group The Emotions, released in 1976 by Columbia Records. The album reached No. 5 on the Billboard Top R&B albums chart. Flowers has been certified Gold in the US by the RIAA.

Overview
The group's first LP on Columbia Records, Flowers was produced by Charles Stepney and Maurice White of Earth, Wind and Fire. The album was reissued with an 8-page booklet, liner notes and a bonus track in 2012.

Singles
The album's title track got to No.16 on the Billboard Hot Soul Songs chart. Another single, "I Don't Wanna Lose Your Love", reached No. 4 on the Billboard Dance/Club Play Songs chart and No.13 on the Billboard Hot Soul Songs chart.

Track listing

Personnel
The Emotions
 Sheila Hutchinson – vocals
 Wanda Hutchinson – vocals
 Jeanette Hutchinson – vocals

Musicians
 Verdine White – bass 
 Larry Dunn – keyboards
 Al McKay, Joe Hutchinson, Jr. – guitars
 Fred White – drums, percussion
 Oscar Brashear, Michael Harris – trumpets
 Don Myrick – alto saxophone
 Richard Brown – tenor saxophone
 Louis Satterfield – trombone
 Tom Tom 84 (Thomas Washington) - arranger
Technical
Recorded by Tom Serrano
Ron Coro, Tom Steele - design
Norman Seeff - photography

Charts

Singles

References

External links
Flowers at Discogs

1976 albums
Columbia Records albums
The Emotions albums
Albums produced by Maurice White
Albums produced by Charles Stepney